The second Handsworth riots took place in the Handsworth district of Birmingham, West Midlands, from 9 to 11 September 1985.  The riots were reportedly sparked by the arrest of a man near the Acapulco Cafe, Lozells and a police raid on the Villa Cross public house in the same area. Hundreds of people attacked police and property, looting and smashing, even setting off fire bombs.

Handsworth had been the scene of a less serious riot four years earlier, when a wave of rioting hit over 30 other British towns and cities during the spring and summer of 1981.

Racial tension and friction between the police and the local ethnic minority communities was seen as a major factor in the riots. Handsworth had been predominantly populated by the black and Asian communities for around 30 years by 1985. Handsworth also had one of the highest unemployment rates in Birmingham.

Two brothers (Kassamali Moledina, 38, and his 44-year-old brother Amirali) were burnt to death in the post office that they ran. Two other people were unaccounted for, 35 others injured, more than 1500 police officers drafted into the area, about 45 shops looted and burnt, and a trail of damage running into hundreds of thousands of pounds. As well as racial tension, unemployment was seen as a major factor in the riots; fewer than 5% of black pupils to have left school in the summer preceding the riot had found employment.

The riots were the subject of John Akomfrah's award-winning documentary film Handsworth Songs. Filmmaker and artist Pogus Caesar extensively documented the riots, his photographs have been exhibited at ICA, London, TATE Britain, Bristol Museum & Art Gallery and National Gallery of Art, Washington, USA. They were depicted in reggae artist Pato Banton's song Handsworth Riots. And they were witnessed by Goldie and Bronx graffiti artists Brim, who documented the devastation in the documentary Bombin' (1987).

The riots were the first of a series of similar riots across the country during the autumn of 1985, notably the Broadwater Farm riot in London which also resulted in a fatality (the murder of policeman Keith Blakelock).

See also
Broadwater Farm riot
1981 Handsworth riots
1991 Handsworth riots
2005 Birmingham riots

References

Sources
 Handsworth Songs, Black Audio Film Collective's 1986 film examining the roots of social disorder in Britain.
"Handsworth Riots 1985" – Pogus Caesar / OOM Gallery Archive/Artimage/DACS Extensive collection of archive photographs taken during Handsworth riots of 1985.
"Handsworth Riot" – a song by reggae singer Pato Banton depicting the events of the riots, with lyrics including first-person accounts from blacks and Asians.

External links
- Burning Images Exhibition 2005
Digital Handsworth photographs of the 1985 uprisings in Handsworth, Birmingham
BBC Birmingham - Your Community - Handsworth Riots
"A Different Reality" at Warwick University.
Gordon Weaver, "Young Blacks, Political Groups and the Police in Handsworth".

Handsworth riots
Handsworth riots
Black British history
Crime in Birmingham, West Midlands
Handsworth riots 1985
Race riots in England
Handsworth riots
Riots and civil disorder in England